Cabriite (Pd2SnCu) is a mineral first found in the eastern Siberian region of Russia and named for the Canadian mineralogist Louis J. Cabri (born 1934).

References

Native element minerals
Orthorhombic minerals
Minerals in space group 47